The 2011 Singapore ATP Challenger was a professional tennis tournament played on hard courts. It was the first edition of the tournament which was part of the 2011 ATP Challenger Tour. It took place in Singapore between 24 and 30 January 2011.

ATP entrants

Seeds

 Rankings are as of January 17, 2011.

Other entrants
The following players received wildcards into the singles main draw:
  Sergei Bubka
  Karan Rastogi
  Peerakiat Siriluethaiwattana
  Dmitry Tursunov

The following players received entry from the qualifying draw:
  Michael Lammer
  Frederik Nielsen
  Artem Sitak
  Yang Tsung-hua

Champions

Singles

 Dmitry Tursunov def.  Lukáš Rosol, 6–4, 6–2

Doubles

 Scott Lipsky /  David Martin def.  Sanchai Ratiwatana /  Sonchat Ratiwatana, 5–7, 6–1, [10–8]

External links
Official Website
ITF Search
ATP official site

Singapore ATP Challenger
Tennis tournaments in Singapore
Singapore ATP Challenger
2011 in Singaporean sport